Thomas de Morley, 5th Baron Morley (1393–1435) was a baron in the Peerage of England, Lord of the manors of Morley, Hingham, Hockering, &c., in Norfolk, de jure Lord Marshall, hereditary Earl Marshal of Ireland, and a Privy Councillor. His parents were Sir Robert de Morley, Knt. (circa 1375 - before 12 November 1403), d.v.p. (son of Thomas de Morley, 4th Baron Morley by first wife Joan de Hastings) and Isabel de Molines (who were married before August 1394).

He was born at Hingham, Norfolk, and was present at the Battle of Agincourt, where he served as a Commander under the indenture of Humphrey, Duke of Gloucester.

Marriage and issue
Thomas was married before 5 February 1402/1403 to Lady Isabel de la Pole (Suffolk, 1395 - 8 February 1466/1467), daughter of Michael de la Pole, 2nd Earl of Suffolk, and Lady Katherine de Stafford, daughter of Hugh de Stafford, 2nd Earl of Stafford, and Lady Philippa de Beauchamp.

They had the following children:

References

1393 births
1435 deaths
People from Hingham, Norfolk
Burials in Norfolk
Barons Morley